"Rain" is a 1997 song by Guano Apes. It was first released in January 1998 as a promotional single, but later had a full release in May 1998 as their second single from their debut album Proud Like a God. It is one of the songs by the band to have a softer sound, followed by "Don't You Turn Your Back on Me", "Living in a Lie", "Pretty in Scarlet" and "Quietly". The music video shows the band walking on a desert, looking for rain.

Track listing

CD single
Rain (Edit) - 3:46
Maria (D+B Smooth Mix) - 5:26
360° Aliendrop (Kaleve Mix) - 4:10*
Rain (Album Version) - 4:38

* "360° Aliendrop (Kaleve Mix)" is an electronica remix of the song "Lords of the Boards".

Promo single
Rain (Edit) - 3:46
360° Aliendrop (Kaleve Mix) - 4:10
Rain (Album Version) - 4:38

Chart positions

References

1997 songs
Rock ballads
Guano Apes songs